Cordón del Azufre is a small, inactive complex volcano located in the Central Andes, at the border of Argentina and Chile.

Geology and geomorphology 

A western component with four craters aligned in a north–south direction on a  ridge forms the oldest part. Numerous monogenetic volcanoes and stratovolcanoes developed on it and buried most of its central crater under lava flows. The eastern component is formed by lava flows and craters in Argentina, and the youngest part la Moyra volcano in the western component generated a lava flow that advanced  westwards. Weakly porphyritic andesite and dacite form the rocks of the volcano.

Lava flows of the eastern component have been dated to be 600,000 years old. No activity, including fumarolic activity, has been recorded at Cordón del Azufre, but the appearance (dark and pristine) and radiometric age (0.3 ± 0.3 mya K-Ar on the most recent flow) of the lava flows suggest a recent age. Pyroclastic deposits are linked to the youngest cone may date to a historical eruption. Renewed activity would likely consist of lava flows and pyroclastic deposits and, in light of the total lack of important roads and habitation, potential future eruptions are no threat.

Geographic context 

The area is uninhabited and remote.

Ground deformation 

The modelled centre of deformation is closer to Azufre than Lastarria. Sometimes Cerro Bayo Gorbea is also associated to this complex. This inflation started in the late 1990s and is probably due to the accumulation of volcanic fluids (hydrothermal or magmatic) beneath the volcanic system. The precise date when the uplift started is unclear, because satellite observation of the area is scarce. The start of the uplift may be related to an earthquake in Chile in 1998, but this is questionable. Aftershocks of the 1995 Antofagasta earthquake may be responsible instead. This uncertainty is largely because estimates trade off between depth, pressure and shape of the deformation. Since 2005 uplift speeds of  have been observed with InSAR and a magma flux rate of  has been inferred. One estimate in 2009 indicated a depth .

The researchers concluded that sill fluid dynamics may explain the pattern of uplift and growth in the uplifting area but without major changes in the magma flux rate. Other data indicate that no lateral expansion may be taking place. The deformation pattern may be controlled by local tectonic stress patterns. There are several Pleistocene volcanoes around the uplift region, which may be supplied from the sill.

This deformation system is among the largest on Earth. It has been compared to deformation occurring at Uturuncu volcano, but the deformation source beneath Lazufre has not been imaged due to resolution limitations. The size of the deformation area is comparable with the size of calderas such as Long Valley and Yellowstone. Likewise, such deformation patterns are mainly found in active caldera systems and in the case of Lazufre may be caused by the refilling of a magma chamber. The hydrothermal system of Lastarria may be influenced by the uplift, with a possible transition from a hydrothermal deformation in 2009 to a magmatic one in 2012, but it's not likely that hydrothermal effects are responsible for the Lazufre deformation. It is not clear whether this deformation is a signal of a future volcanic eruption, but monitoring has been recommended as it may be at risk of a major silicic eruption. Research published in 2016 indicated that the uplift has been ongoing since at least 400,000 years, based on the deformation of lava flows and volcanoes erupted within this time period. Depending on the highly uncertain estimates for the volume of the magma chamber, a modest overpressure may be sufficient to cause the roof of the chamber to fail and an eruption to start.

See also
List of volcanoes in Chile
List of volcanoes in Argentina
Los Colorados (caldera)

References

Complex volcanoes
Volcanoes of Atacama Region
Volcanoes of Catamarca Province
Subduction volcanoes
Mountains of Argentina
Mountains of Chile
Argentina–Chile border
International mountains of South America
Volcanoes of Antofagasta Region